Werner Klatt (21 December 1948 – 3 April 2022) was a German rower who competed for East Germany in the 1976 Summer Olympics. He was born in Schöneberg. In 1976, he was a crew member of the East German boat, which won the gold medal in the eight event.

References

External links
 

1948 births
2022 deaths
Olympic rowers of East Germany
Rowers at the 1976 Summer Olympics
Olympic gold medalists for East Germany
Olympic medalists in rowing
East German male rowers
World Rowing Championships medalists for East Germany
Medalists at the 1976 Summer Olympics
People from Schöneberg
European Rowing Championships medalists